PARTISANS is a Toronto-based architecture firm recognized for its  future-forward approach to design and technology, civic advocacy and cultural engagement. The firm was founded in 2012 by partners Alex Josephson and Pooya Baktash.  Jonathan Friedman, a licensed architect with a decade of experience in Toronto, joined the firm as a partner in 2014. The name PARTISANS represent the firm's interest in collective action and architecture as a political force for social and cultural good.

Contribution to Canadian Architecture 
PARTISANS has contributed significantly to architecture in Canada through its unique style and approach which regards architecture as a collective, political act. “Canada has a limited roster of world-class architects, who mostly work for rarified clients. It also has a small community of boutique studios that do creative one-off pieces, usually private residences. But Partisans… is different—a critical firm, specializing not only in design but also in rhetoric and activism. In six years, the firm has worked up a varied portfolio: houses, furniture, industrial pieces, restaurant interiors, sculptural lighting, books, and public interventions that border on performance art."

In 2020 the firm was recognized with the Emerging Architectural Practice Award by the Royal Architectural Institute of Canada. According to the 2020 jury, “The firm’s projects are original, powerful and evocative. The team is capable of thinking at all scales from interiors to city planning; the works speak to a vision for the future that is free-minded and innovative. As outspoken advocates for the quality of architecture as a social vehicle, their success is evidenced by the beloved spaces they have crafted.” In Canada, where the architecture profession is increasingly corporate and conservative, PARTISANS embodies a "bold and expansive vision of architecture as an art form and a profession engaged with the biggest cultural questions."

History 
In 2008, the founders of PARTISANS, Josephson and Baktash, were finishing their master's of architecture degree at the University of Waterloo. They became close as they consulted on each other's thesis projects, and decided to go into business together. Alex Josephson had previously worked as a sculptor and worked for the architect Massimiliano Fuksas in Rome before returning to Canada. Both founders had previously worked at larger firms, where they were unable to be creative, and soon decided to set up their shop together. Starting with small commissions from family, the pair soon started building their firm up, winning a commission from Osmington to become the lead architect of the redevelopment and expansion of Toronto’s historic Union Station’s commercial real estate “to leverage Union’s identity as a major transit hub and transform it into ‘a fluid stage for Toronto’s most ambitious culinary, cultural, design, and retail offerings."  Jonathan Friedman, a licensed architect with a decade of experience in Toronto, joined the firm in 2014 and is now the third partner.

Publications

Graphic Novel 
In 2014, Partisans published a graphic novel called "Suburbabylonia", a part manifesto, part satire novel. The book has the appearance of dreamy images and truth-seeking spaceman hero, but beneath the surface, the authors aim to mock an off-kilter version of a Toronto-like metropolis, destroyed by unchecked building boom and ineptitude of municipal politicians.

Book 
In 2016, Hans Ibelings along with Partisans co-wrote a book called "Rise and Sprawl: The Condominiumization of Toronto". Together they tackle the criticism of Toronto's current skyline, and how the rapid growth of downtown as well as the condominium development has changed Toronto.

Articles

Projects 

 Grotto Sauna 
 First Tower 55 Yonge (Toronto)
 Bar Raval 
 Master Planning Innisfil Mobility Orbit, Garden City Plan for 50,000 new homes Ontario 
 Toronto Biennial of Art 
 Luminato Festival of the Arts, The Hearn
 Italian eatery Gusto 501
revamping Union Station, Toronto’s central train terminal

References 

Architecture firms of Canada
Companies based in Toronto